The lieutenant governor of Indiana is a constitutional office in the US state of Indiana. Republican Suzanne Crouch, who assumed office January 9, 2017, is the incumbent. The office holder's constitutional roles are to serve as the president of the Indiana Senate, become acting governor during the incapacity of the governor, and become governor should the incumbent governor resign, die in office, or be impeached and removed from office. Lieutenant governors have succeeded ten governors following their deaths or resignations. The lieutenant governor holds statutory positions, serving as the head of the state agricultural and rural affairs bureaus, and as the chairman of several state committees.

The lieutenant governor is elected on the same election ticket as the governor in a statewide election held every four years, concurrent with United States presidential elections. Should a lieutenant governor die while in office, resign, or succeed to the governorship, the constitution specifies no mechanism by which to fill vacancies in the lieutenant governor's office. Historically, the position has generally remained vacant during such events. The last attempt to fill such a vacancy in 1887 led to the outbreak of violence in the state legislature known as the Black Day of the General Assembly. However, in recent years the governor has appointed a lieutenant governor if a vacancy arises.

Requirements
The position of lieutenant governor was created with the adoption of the first Constitution of Indiana in August 1816. The position was filled by an October election. The position was retained and the current requirements established in the state's second and current constitution adopted in 1851.

To become lieutenant governor, a candidate must have been a United States citizen and lived within Indiana for the period of five consecutive years before the election. The candidate must also be at least thirty years old when sworn into office. The lieutenant governor may not hold any federal office during his term, and must resign from any such position before being eligible to be sworn in as lieutenant governor. Before taking the office, the candidate must swear an oath of office administered by the chief justice of the Indiana Supreme Court, promising to uphold the constitution and laws of Indiana.

Succession

The lieutenant governor serves as acting governor when the governor becomes incapacitated. In the state's early history, lieutenant governors would serve as acting governor while the governor was away from the capital. Christopher Harrison was the first lieutenant governor to serve as acting governor while Jonathan Jennings negotiated treaties far from the capital.

If the governor dies in office, becomes permanently incapacitated, resigns, or is impeached, the lieutenant governor becomes governor. In total, ten lieutenant governors become governor by succession. The first occurrence was when Jonathan Jennings resigned to become a congressman and was succeeded by Ratliff Boon.

In the event that both the governorship and lieutenant-governorship are vacant, the constitution stipulates that the Senate president pro tempore becomes governor. Historically, governors appointed the pro tempore to serve as acting lieutenant governor as a formality. This practice ended in the early twentieth century. Although the constitution did not specify a method to fill a vacancy in the lieutenant governorship, an attempt to fill a vacancy occurred in 1887. When the winner of the election attempted to be seated, the Senate erupted into violence known as the Black Day of the General Assembly; the lieutenant governor-elect was sworn in but never seated.

Should the lieutenant governorship become vacant for any reason, including death, resignation, or succession, the governor may nominate a replacement who must be approved by both houses of the General Assembly.

Authority

Constitutional

The lieutenant governor has two constitutional functions. The primary function is to serve as the president of the Indiana Senate. In the Senate the lieutenant governor is permitted to debate on legislation, introduce legislation, and vote on matters to break ties. As presiding officer in the Senate, lieutenant governors also have partial control over what legislation will be considered, and influence on the legislative calendar. Unless a special session is called by the governor, the Senate meets for no more than 91 days in any two years period, leaving the lieutenant governor free from his or her senatorial duties in the remainder of the year.

The secondary function is to serve as a successor to the governorship should it become vacant, or act as governor if necessary. If a lieutenant governor should succeed to the governorship, the office of lieutenant governor and president of the Senate become vacant; the duties are taken over by the Senate president pro tempore.

Statutory
The majority of the powers exercised by the lieutenant governor are statutory and have been assigned by the Indiana General Assembly. The first additional powers granted to the lieutenant governor were added in 1932 when the office holder was made the head of the state's agricultural commission. The office's powers have since expanded to include the chairmanship of the Office of Community and Rural Affairs, the Indiana Housing and Community Development Authority, Office of Energy and Defense Development, and the Office of Tourism Development. As head of the various office and committees, the lieutenant governor controls many patronage positions and is permitted to fill them by appointment. Important positions filled by the lieutenant governor include the members of the Corn Marketing Council, the Main Street Council, Steel Advisory Commission, and the Indiana Film Commission.

In addition to the chairmanship of the committees, the lieutenant governor is also a participating member of the Natural Resources Committee, State Office Building Commission, Air Pollution Control Board, Water Pollution Control Board, and Solid Waste Management Board.

The annual salary of the lieutenant governor is set by the Indiana General Assembly and was $76,000 in 2007.

List of lieutenant governors of Indiana
There have been forty-nine lieutenant governors of Indiana since Indiana became a state in 1816.

Notes

References

Bibliography

External links

 
1816 establishments in Indiana